A mud clerk was a helper or all-around worker aboard a steamboat during the period before and after the American Civil War, particularly aboard steamboats on the Mississippi River.

According to Mark Twain in his autobiography, "Mud clerks received no salary, but they were in the line of promotion. They could become, presently, third clerk and second clerk, then chief clerk -- that is to say, purser".

Mud clerks were always male, and typically in their early teens or younger. Duties included such things as running errands for the officers of the steamboat, carrying messages around the ship, and fetching food or beverages. As the name itself implies, mud clerks would often be given the dirtiest jobs aboard ship.

See also
 Life on the Mississippi

Mississippi River
Obsolete occupations